Craig McNicoll (born 11 April 1971) is a British speed skater. He competed at the 1988 Winter Olympics and the 1992 Winter Olympics.

References

External links
 

1971 births
Living people
British male speed skaters
Olympic speed skaters of Great Britain
Speed skaters at the 1988 Winter Olympics
Speed skaters at the 1992 Winter Olympics
Sportspeople from Paisley, Renfrewshire